Robert Farrar or Ferrers (by 1528 – 1572/76), was an English politician.

He was a Member (MP) of the Parliament of England for Lincoln in March 1553, October 1553, April 1554, November 1554, 1555 and 1559 and for Tavistock in 1571 and 1572.

References

1570s deaths
English MPs 1553 (Edward VI)
English MPs 1553 (Mary I)
English MPs 1554
English MPs 1554–1555
English MPs 1555
English MPs 1571
English MPs 1572–1583
Year of birth uncertain
Members of the Parliament of England for Tavistock